ʿAbd al-Malik ibn Aḥmad ibn Hūd Imād ad-Dawla, known by the regnal name Imad al-Dawla (in Arabic: Pillar of the dynasty), Latinised as Mitadolus, was the fifth and last king of the Hudid dynasty to rule the Taifa of Zaragoza during a very short time in 1110.

Succeeding Al-Musta'in II on his death in 1110, he could not resist the constant harassment of the Almoravids and the Aragonese, and was forced to ask for help from Castile, becoming de facto one of its vassals. When the Almoravids conquered the Taifa of Zaragoza in 1110, Imad al-Dawla took refuge in the then-impenetrable fortress of Rueda de Jalón, where he created a microstate. With this the taifa of Zaragoza expired.

ʿAbd al-Malik continued to fight against the Almoravids, until the Aragonese king Alfonso the Battler conquered Zaragoza in 1118. He died in 1130 and was succeeded in Rueda de Jalón by his son Zafadola.

References 

Emirs of Zaragoza
11th-century rulers in Al-Andalus
12th-century rulers in Europe
Banu Hud
11th-century Arabs

1130 deaths
Year of birth unknown